Mount McLaren is a  mountain summit located in Alberta, Canada.

Description

Mount McLaren is situated six kilometers southwest of the town of Coleman in the Crowsnest Pass area and can be seen from the Crowsnest Highway (Highway 3). It is part of the Flathead Range which is a subset of the Canadian Rockies. The peak is set two kilometers east of the Continental Divide, in Castle Wildland Provincial Park. Precipitation runoff from the mountain drains into Star and North York creeks which are tributaries of the nearby Crowsnest River. Topographic relief is significant as the summit rises over 945 meters (3,100 feet) above the river in 5 kilometers (3.1 miles).

History

Mount McLaren is named after Peter McLaren (1833–1919), a Canadian politician and Senator from Perth, Ontario. Senator Peter McLaren was involved in the timber trade and operated a sawmill on Mill Creek (west of Pincher Creek) which provided railroad ties for the construction of the Crowsnest Pass Railway in 1897 and 1898. His loggers hewed the trees ahead of track layers. The mountain's toponym was officially adopted March 15, 1962, by the Geographical Names Board of Canada.

On January 19, 1946, a Royal Canadian Air Force DC-3 struck Mount Ptolemy and crashed into the North York Creek valley below Mount McLaren. All seven crewmembers perished in the accident. Some wreckage of the aircraft is still present.

Geology
Mount McLaren is composed of limestone which is a sedimentary rock laid down during the Precambrian to Jurassic periods. Formed in shallow seas, this sedimentary rock was pushed east and over the top of younger Cretaceous period rock during the Laramide orogeny.

Climate
Based on the Köppen climate classification, Mount McLaren has an alpine subarctic climate with cold, snowy winters, and mild summers. Temperatures can drop below −20 °C with wind chill factors below −30 °C.

Gallery

See also
Geology of Alberta
Geography of Alberta

References

External links
 Mount McLaren: weather forecast

Two-thousanders of Alberta
Canadian Rockies
Crowsnest Pass, Alberta